Auto reignition is a process used in gas burners to control ignition devices based on whether a burner flame is lit. This information can be used to stop an ignition device from sparking, which is no longer necessary after the flame is lit. It can also be used to start the sparking device again if the flame goes out while the burner is still supplying gas, for example, from a gust of wind or vibration.

Kitchen appliances 
Most gas ranges and cooktops use sparking devices to ignite the burner flame. This eliminates the need for a pilot flame, which wastes energy. Most of these sparking device-equipped ranges require the user to control the ignition sparking manually, resulting in a three-step process required to operate the burner:

turn burner knob to a position that opens the gas valve and activates the sparking (typically labelled "Light")
wait for ignition, typically 0.5 to 2 seconds
turn burner knob past lite position, to stop the sparking noise and burning out the ignition electrode, to a desired flame intensity

One implementation of a gas burner with auto reignition senses the electrical conductivity of the flame. This nonzero flame conductivity is because combustion of natural gas releases enough free electrons to support a small current in air. An electronic circuit then starts or stops the igniter from sparking, based on whether the flame is lit. This reduces the number of steps to turn a burner on from three to one:

turn knob to a desired flame intensity—while confirming flame ignites

This is an elegant solution, compared to detecting flame via a thermocouple, a photoresistor or a mercury-filled sensor. No extra components or electrical connections between the sparker electrode and the spark module electronics are required.

This convenience and safety feature is found only (as of June 2009) on higher priced gas ranges and cooktops.

The case for requiring auto reignition as a safety feature  
Auto reignition lowers the risk of gas leaks:

if a flame goes out during operation, for example, from vibration or a gust of wind
due to misoperation—a user might not understand the "light" position must be maintained for about 0.5 to 2 seconds before turning the burner knob on fully. The user might, as a result, turn the burner knob on quickly past the "light" position without the burning actually igniting and leave the kitchen; thus leaving the gas burner leaking gas into the room.

This feature is especially valuable on gas burners with several different short-term users, less likely to bother with or learn multi-step procedures—for example, gas ranges in rental properties, guest houses, or in office kitchens.

Firelighting
Cooking appliances